Siegfried Roßberg (born 4 November 1936 in Dresden) is an East German sprint canoeist who competed in the early 1960s. He won three medals at the 1963 ICF Canoe Sprint World Championships in Jajce with a gold (K-4 1000 m) and two bronzes (K-1 1000 m, K-1 4 x 500 m). He has received the awards Master of Sport and Honoured Master of Sport. He studied at TU Dresden and graduated Bachelor of Engineering (civil).

References

1937 births
German male canoeists
Living people
ICF Canoe Sprint World Championships medalists in kayak
German civil engineers
Recipients of the Master of Sport
Recipients of the Honoured Master of Sport
Engineers from Dresden
Sportspeople from Dresden